Rhona Dwinger (born 28 June 1971) is a retired South African javelin thrower.

She won the bronze medal at the 1992 African Championships, the silver medal at the 1993 African Championships, finished eighth at the 1994 World Cup and won the gold medal at the 1995 All-Africa Games.

Her personal best throw is 58,32 metres, achieved in February 2000 at ABSA Meeting in Greenpoint stadium Cape Town.

References

1971 births
Living people
South African female discus throwers
South African female javelin throwers
African Games gold medalists for South Africa
Athletes (track and field) at the 1995 All-Africa Games
African Games medalists in athletics (track and field)
South African Athletics Championships winners